Jerome C. Glenn (born August 9, 1945) is a futurist who serves as the executive director of the Millennium Project.  He has been the executive director of the American Council for the United Nations University (1988–2007) and the deputy director of Partnership for Productivity International.

Early life 
Glenn graduated from American University with a BA in Philosophy (1968) and Antioch University New England with an MA in Teaching Social Science where he created Futuristic Curriculum (1971).  In 1972 Glenn invented the Futures Wheel, a new method of brainstorming about the future, and in 1973 he coined the term "futuring."   He was a Peace Corps Volunteer 1968 to 1970 focused on how tropical medicine and management can be used to combat leprosy; his efforts led Saturday Review to label Glenn as one of America's most gifted leaders in a 1974 article.

Career 
Jerome (Jerry) Glenn was the SYNCON coordinator for The Committee for the Future (1973-1975) and a founding partner of Future Options Room (FOR) in 1975 with Roy Mason and Scott Dankman Joy. FOR was one of the first futures consulting firms and had Alvin Toffler, Herman Kahn, Ted Gordon, and other leading futurists on its board. Glenn helped to craft the section of the SALT II treaty (1979) that prohibited the USSR from deploying its Fractional Orbital Bombardment System.  In 1983 he created CARINET, a computer network that CGNET Services International later acquired, and through CARINET he introduced data packet switching to numerous countries in the developing world.  In 1996 Glenn and Theodore J. Gordon wrote a report in cooperation with the Smithsonian Institution and the Futures Group (rebranded as Palladium International) about the feasibility of establishing a futures think tank; later that year he co-founded the Millennium Project,  an organization that evaluates 15 global challenges to the future of humanity.  He authors an annual publication, State of the Future, on behalf of the Millennium Project, and in the book he uses a compilation of various methodologies in order to ensure effective forecasting.   As Director of the Millennium Project he consults governments, organizations, and corporations about his forecasting methodology and on other issues, such as defense and technology.; His work has been cited over 3,300 times according to Google Scholar.</ref>

Opinions 
Glenn believes that horizontal organizational structures are more effective than vertical ones.  He declared, "The future of management is not based on a hierarchical structure, but on connecting different lines of action through nodes."   According to Glenn, such human cooperation is necessary in order to create collective intelligence.  Consequently, he has praised Wikipedia as a model for how to use international cooperation as a way to foster collective intelligence.

Glenn also argues that the 15 global challenges that he identifies are all interrelated.  From his perspective, improvements in one area (such as access to clean water) will lead to advances in others (such as the rich-poor gap).  Hence, Glenn believes that these issues need to be solved simultaneously. His preferred future is Conscious-Technology Civilization with a Self-Actualization Economy. Glenn has also referred to the future of Africa " Many tribal power zero-sum games will continue, but eventually, the African Union will become more effective and help the more peaceful development of the continent."

Selected publications 
 State of the Future 19.1 (2018)
 Environmental Security Rising on the International Agenda (2015)
 Collective intelligence systems and an application by The Millennium Project for the Egyptian Academy of Scientific Research and Technology (2013)
 2012 State of the Future (2012)
 The Year 3000 Six Scenarii on the Future of Humanity (2011)
 Three alternative Middle East peace scenarios (2005)
 The world in 2050: a normative scenario (1999)
 Industry into Orbit (1978)

References

External links 
 The Millennium Project 
 Global Futures Intelligence System

Futurologists
1945 births
Living people
American University alumni
Antioch University New England alumni